Fox River National Wildlife Refuge, managed by staff at Horicon National Wildlife Refuge, encompasses  of wetland and upland habitat along the Fox River in the Town of Buffalo, in Marquette County, Wisconsin.

Refuge staff restores, enhances, and preserves the oak savanna upland and sedge meadow wetland habitats historically found in extensive areas along the Fox River. Staff manage the wildlife populations that use these habitats, with special emphasis on those species dependent upon large expanses of natural marsh, such as the greater sandhill crane.

Other management objectives include protecting the habitats of any Federal or State endangered or threatened species within the refuge, such as the state threatened Blanding's turtle, and to make the refuge available for outdoor recreation, environmental education, and other public-use activities compatible with the above objectives.

References
Refuge website

National Wildlife Refuges in Wisconsin
Protected areas of Marquette County, Wisconsin
Wetlands of Wisconsin
Landforms of Marquette County, Wisconsin
Protected areas established in 1929
1929 establishments in Wisconsin